The Secret of the Iron Door (translit. Tayna zheleznoy dveri) is a 1970 Soviet children's film directed by Mikhail Yuzovsky after a screenplay by Aleksandr Rejzhevsky loosely based on a story Wizard Walked Through the City by Yuri Tomin. It was produced by Gorky Film Studio.

Plot summary 
Fourth form boy Tolik Ryizhkov (Evaldas Mikaliunas) is a naughty child and fibber. Once he received a box of magic matches while hiding behind the iron door of a transformer booth. Every match, when broken, can act like a magic wand but just once.

A boy with his two friends and a dog find themselves on an island of an evil wizard (Sergei Yevsyunin) of their age, who found the equal box of matches and used them to create his own little egocentric world.

The young wizard put Tolik's friends in prison and is trying to make Tolik as evil as himself. But Tolik stays faithful to his friendship and rescues his friends without the help of any magic.

Cast 
 Evaldas Mikaliunas as Tolik (boy)
 Andrei Kharybin as Mishka (boy)
 Dmitri Yuzovsky as Mitka (boy)
 Sergei Yevsyunin as Wizard (boy)
 Alisa Freindlich as Tolik's mother
 Oleg Tabakov as Tolik's father
 Saveli Kramarov as guitar player Zaytsev / Pigeon
 Yuri Uspensky as Robot Balbes
 Alexander Ivanov as traffic policeman 
 Gerasim Voronkov as violinist Leonid
 Vyacheslav Tsyupa as Chicha

Supporting cast
 Vladimir Brezhnev,  Valeri Fomenkov,    Svetlana Galkina 
 Tatyana Grishina,   Anatoli Ivanov,    Eduard Ivanov 
 Dmitri Kitayev,     Boris Mayorov,      Yevgeni Mayorov 
 Tatyana Mikhajlova, Vladimir Popkov,    Nikolai Sologubov 
 Svetlana Starikova, Georgi Svetlani

Crew
Cinematography by Vitaly Grishin. 
Music by Vadim Gamaleya, lyrics by Evgeny Agranovich. 
Artists  by  Lyudmila Bezsmertnova, Aleksander Vagichev. 
Editing by Yanina Bogolepova. 
Costumes by M. Tomashevskaya.

Trivia 
After transforming back from pigeon into Zaytsev Saveli Kramarov appears nude in the end of the film.

References

External links

1970 films
Russian children's fantasy films
1970s adventure films
1970s science fiction films
1970s Russian-language films
Gorky Film Studio films
Films based on Russian novels
Soviet children's films